Elections to Tower Hamlets London Borough Council were held on 3 May 1990.  The whole council was up for election. Turnout was 42.9%.

Election result

|}

Results

References

1990
1990 London Borough council elections
20th century in the London Borough of Tower Hamlets